A'dam may refer to:
Amsterdam, the capital of the Netherlands
A'DAM, the former Shell-Toren or Toren Overhoeks in Amsterdam
A'dam, an Item of the One Power in the fictional world of Robert Jordan's The Wheel of Time series